Tranquille (Shuswap language: Pellqweq'wíle) is a neighbourhood of the City of Kamloops, British Columbia, Canada, located on the northeast side of Kamloops Lake.  It is the site of the Tranquille Sanatorium, a home for the mentally disabled, a tuberculosis sanatorium, and originally the Kamloops Home for Men.  It gets its name from that of the Tranquille River, which enters Kamloops Lake in this area, and so indirectly is named for Chief Tranquille, or Pacamoose, who was the leader of the Secwepemc people in this region in the early 19th Century.

A real estate developer has proposed redeveloping the area. Some superstitious locals believe this site to be haunted by the spirits of patients and care workers.

References

Neighbourhoods in Kamloops
Ghost towns in British Columbia